CEWS may refer to:
 Canada Emergency Wage Subsidy, a temporary Canadian business assistance program during the COVID-19 pandemic
 Continental Early Warning System, a conflict early warning system of the African Union

See also
 CEW (disambiguation)